Fawaz A. Gerges is a Lebanese-American academic and author with expertise on the Middle East, U.S. foreign policy, international relations, Al Qaeda, and relations between the Islamic and Western worlds.

He is currently a Professor of Middle East Politics and International Relations at the London School of Economics and Political Science. He also holds the Emirates Chair of the Contemporary Middle East at the LSE and was the inaugural Director of the LSE Middle East Centre.

Biography
Fawaz A. Gerges, a U.S. citizen, was born into a Christian Orthodox family in 1959 in Beirut, Lebanon. During the Lebanese Civil War, his hometown was destroyed by Islamic militants, forcing his family to flee to Syria and take refuge in Christian monasteries. Gerges stayed in Syria for a year before moving to the United States.

He earned a MSc at the London School of Economics and a DPhil from Oxford University. He taught at Oxford, Harvard, and Columbia universities and was a research fellow at Princeton University for two years. He held the Christian A. Johnson Endeavor Foundation Chair in Middle Eastern Studies and International Affairs at Sarah Lawrence College.

In the last decade Gerges spent five years conducting field research in several Middle Eastern countries on several topics and subjects, including social movements (such as the Muslim Brotherhood, and jihadist groups like Al Qaeda), on Arab and Muslim politics in the 20th century, and relations between the West and the Muslim world.

Gerges is the author of numerous books and publications, including two recently acclaimed texts: Journey of the Jihadist: Inside Muslim Militancy (2007), and The Far Enemy: Why Jihad Went Global (2009). The Washington Post selected The Far Enemy as one of the best 15 books published in the field. Journey of the Jihadist was on the best-selling list of Barnes & Noble and Foreign Affairs magazine for several months.

On the ten-year anniversary of 9/11, Oxford University Press released Gerges' book, The Rise and Fall of Al Qaeda (2011). Gerges' book, Obama and the Middle East  (May 2012) was published by Pelgrave Macmillan one year later.

He has appeared on television and radio networks throughout the world, including CNN, ABC, CBS, NPR, the BBC and Al Jazeera. During the weeks leading up to the 2003 U.S. invasion of Iraq, he was a regular guest on The Oprah Winfrey Show, PBS’s The NewsHour with Jim Lehrer and The Charlie Rose Show.

At the occasion of the 10 years anniversary of the Arab Spring protests, Gerges warned that the root causes for social unrest in the Arab World were still simmering, adding that "the status quo is untenable, and the next explosion will be catastrophic”.

Personal
Gerges is married to Professor Nora Colton, Dean of the Royal Docks Business School and currently the Deputy Vice-Chancellor (Academic) at the University of East London. The couple have four children.

Gerges was born during a Lebanese civil war in 1958 and was part of the 1975 war generation. According to him, "My generation was wiped out—killed, mutilated and polluted by sectarian-tribal conflict between 1975 and 1990, or forced into exile." Although he immigrated to the United States to escape the conflict, Gerges' younger brother, Bassam, was killed during the war in 1990. Gerges has lived most of his life in the United States.

Works
 Gerges, Fawaz A.  (2018).  Making the Arab World: Nasser, Qutb, and the Clash That Shaped the Middle East. Princeton University Press. .
 Gerges, Fawaz A. (2016). ISIS: A History. Princeton University Press. .
 Gerges, Fawaz A. (2015). Contentious Politics in the Middle East: Popular Resistance and Marginalized Activism beyond the Arab Uprisings. Palgrave Macmillan.

External links
 
 Articles at The Guardian

1958 births
Writers from Beirut
Lebanese emigrants to the United States
American anti-war activists
Living people
Sarah Lawrence College faculty
Harvard University faculty
Columbia University faculty
Academics of the London School of Economics
Alumni of the London School of Economics
Alumni of the University of Oxford
Eastern Orthodox Christians from Lebanon
Historians of the Islamic State of Iraq and the Levant
Princeton University fellows